Sinningia globulosa is a tuberous member of the flowering plant family Gesneriaceae. It is found in Brazil.

References

External links

globulosa
Flora of Brazil